Dina Arturivna Miftakhutdinova (born 2 November 1973) is a retired rower from Ukraine, who won a silver medal at the 1996 Summer Olympics. She is a two-time Olympian. In Atlanta, Georgia her teammates in the women's quadruple sculls were Olena Ronzhyna, Svitlana Maziy, and Inna Frolova.

References
 

1973 births
Living people
Ukrainian female rowers
Olympic rowers of Ukraine
Rowers at the 1996 Summer Olympics
Rowers at the 2000 Summer Olympics
Olympic silver medalists for Ukraine
Olympic medalists in rowing
Medalists at the 1996 Summer Olympics